Sophie McBurnie (born 14 March 1999), known professionally as piri, is an English dance musician, pole dancer, social media personality, and pornographic content creator. Along with Venbee and PinkPantheress, she has been described as "leading" the 2020s drum and bass revival.

Born in Rochdale, McBurnie took up playing guitar in primary school, but did not consider music a viable career until she met Tommy Villiers of Porij and See Thru Hands in August 2020 after matching with him on Tinder. They released the disco song "it's a match" on 12 March 2021 and then the liquid drum and bass song "soft spot" on 4 June 2021, which charted at No. 1 on TikTok and attracted the attention of EMI, who signed them up for a three-single deal, which included a re-release of "soft spot" on 13 September 2021, the jungle track "beachin" on 29 January 2022, and the speed garage song "words" on 22 April 2022.

Later in 2022, they signed with Polydor Records, on which they released the liquid drum and bass song "on & on" on 29 July 2022, which charted at No. 99 on the UK Singles Chart on 11 November 2022; they also released the mixtape froge.mp3 (pronounced frogue) on 21 October 2022 and "unlock it", a cover of the Charli XCX, Kim Petras and Jay Park song "Unlock It" from Pop 2 on 11 November 2022. After it was announced in January 2023 that McBurnie and Villiers had broken up, the pair were featured on MJ Cole's 20 January 2023 UK garage single "Feel It", before releasing their own single, the hyperpop song "updown", on 17 February 2023.

McBurnie is noted for her frog motif, derived from a nickname she and Villiers used to give each other, for her pole dancing, which she discovered at Lancaster University's pole fitness society and occasionally integrates into her performances, and her openness, from sharing her personal life on social media to subjects of songs. She funded her career and move to London using her OnlyFans account, which she set up in May 2020; she also maintains a TikTok account, which as of November 2022 has "over 419,000 followers", and a Twitter and Instagram account. She is a member of Loud LDN, a collective of London-based female and non-binary creatives, and she has been vocal about her experiences as a woman in the music industry.

Early life and pornography
McBurnie was born on 14 March 1999 and grew up in Rochdale. Her parents were an Asda manager and a human resources manager. Her stage name was a truncated form of pirickili, which was created for a Tumblr account; in an interview with Unity Radio in October 2021, she said that she came across it after "using a gibberish word generator to come up with a username […], and then everyone just shortened that to piri when talking to [her] online". She had previously worked part time shifts at Asda and at Greggs.

She holds a degree in chemistry from Lancaster University. Whilst in her third year of university, she set up an OnlyFans account in May 2020; she told The Times in November 2022 that she experienced less backlash than she was expecting, and that "my belief is that if I'm not ashamed of it, [people] can't really hold it against me. If I tried to hide it, people could use it against me. […] Nudity shouldn't be a taboo. We've always had nudity in our culture – look at classical statues. It's not inherently immoral to be naked. I'm not doing anything wrong." As of November 2022, her OnlyFans account had "about 1,000 to 2,000 fans paying about $12 a month", which after the site had deducted its fees meant she made "between $10,000 and $20,000 a month", which she was able to use to fund her music career, buy a computer and microphone, and move to north London.

Career

2020–2021: Cover versions and "it's a match"

In November 2020, McBurnie released two cover versions to YouTube; on 14 November 2020, she and Villiers released a cover of MOOO! by Doja Cat, and on 22 November, she released a version of "You're the One" by Kaytranada featuring Syd from 99.9%. On 19 February 2021, she released an acoustic cover version of "The Last Time" by Eric Benét from Hurricane. On 12 March 2021, McBurnie released a single, "it's a match", with Tommy Villiers, which has been described as "disco-infused". She released one further cover version to YouTube on 25 March 2021, a version of Teardrops by Womack & Womack.

2021–2022: "soft spot", "beachin", and "words"

Later that year, they self-released the single "soft spot" on DistroKid on 4 June 2021, which was again credited to "piri & tommy villiers". The song has been described as "liquid drum 'n' bass" and features loon birds. She told NME in December 2021 that the song was about "falling for someone and being unsure if they feel the same, but still having no way to stop yourself – but with optimism that it will all work out". According to a September 2022 interview for Apple Music, the song was "made across two student houses", and its vocals were recorded under a duvet. She told Unity Radio in October 2021 that she paid six TikTok creators £20 to use the song in one of their videos, and took out "a couple of Instagram ads and a couple of like TikTok ads, like not creator promotions". The song went viral after being featured in a TikTok video of a creator making a Japanese bench, which acquired 1,000,000 views; the song went to No. 1 on TikTok and saw use in over 100,000 videos, including by Bella Hadid, Molly-Mae Hague, and Rebecca Black, and caught the attention of Charli XCX, who stated that she ran to it in the gym, pinkpantheress, who direct messaged the pair to say she thought the song's "beat goes stupid", and EMI, who re-released "soft spot" on 13 September 2021. MJ Cole provided the song's official remix after she and Villiers sent a long list of suggested artists to their label, including bigger artists such as Cole, and were not expecting him to respond. The song had also been played on Sunday Brunch. Rolling Stone named it as the fifty-ninth greatest dance song of all time. A music video was released on 4 June 2021.

Their follow up single, "beachin", was released on 28 January 2022, and was credited to piri & tommy, with Skream providing the official remix. It was written after a trip to Formby beach in Liverpool, and was Villiers' attempt at making a jungle track, which he later annotated with what he described as "some Isley Brothers type of tones", and spent hours adding waves and seagulls. The song's lyrics were an attempt at encapsulating how much they enjoyed the trip and how close they felt afterwards. The song was first played on BBC Radio 1's Future Sounds with Clara Amfo; in a verified annotation on Genius, McBurnie pointed out that subsequent Radio 1 plays censored the lyric "bussin' he making some mayo", and when asked on Twitter in January 2023 what she meant by the lyric, she replied that it was a reference to ejaculation. The word 'breasts' was also censored. It ends with a spoken word section, from a video of the trip; a picture from the trip was made into the song's cover art. The song was also made into a BBC Radio 1 jingle.

The band's third release, "words", was released on 22 April 2022, the same day as Words by Alesso and Zara Larsson. Remixes came from Hamdi and Higgo. The song was intended by Villiers as a "Disclosure meets old school speed garage" song. Lyrically, the song describes a challenging period in their relationship, and helped them express their frustrations and work through their problems; it has been described by McBurnie as a "kind of a commentary on different levels of maturity in relationships, particularly in young people". In the week after its release, the band went on a three-day tour. A music video for "words" was released on 17 June 2022.

2022: "on & on", "froge.mp3", and "unlock it"

In 2022, they signed to Polydor Records. Their fourth single as piri & tommy, "on & on", was released on 29 July 2022, with Sudley providing the remix. The song was first played on a Jack Saunders-presented edition of BBC Radio 1's Future Sounds. A music video was released on 12 October 2022. It was written in September 2021 shortly after the pair attended that year's Parklife Festival, has been described as having a "liquid DnB beat and textural garage-esque synths", and was described by McBurnie during an MTV interview as being written "about British festival culture and how people can get really tired and like dirty, especially by the third day of the festival, but you just have this like drive [to] just keep on moving". The drums were lifted from an earlier jump-up track Villiers had made about a year earlier, which featured "grotty Belgian bass". The song appeared on the 11 November 2022 UK Singles Chart at No. 99. Billboard rated it as one of 'The 50 Best Dance Songs Of 2022', and it was used on the 27 February 2023 broadcast of series 9 of Love Island.

On 23 August 2022, McBurnie was featured on the remix of KkbutTerFLY27 Xx's single "omg i rlly like u". She signed a solo record deal in September 2022 with Warner Chappell Music. "soft spot", "beachin", "words", and "on & on" featured on their mixtape froge.mp3, which was released on 21 October 2022, with a vinyl release on 22 April 2023. In an interview with Onestowatch.com, she described the mixtape as "basically a diary of the first year tommy and I have been making music, and pretty much the first year of us knowing each other at all. Each song (in both lyrics and vibe) captures a different point in time of our journey, and the different experiences and emotions we were going through. […] It's so cool having a collection of tracks to document parts of our lives in that way, like a little time capsule." The mixtape was promoted with a nine-date tour, froge.tour, in November 2023, and a twelve episode YouTube Shorts series, froge.tv, where they explained what the album's songs were written about.

She, Venbee and PinkPantheress were described in November 2022 by NME as "leading the new British drum 'n' bass scene". Their final single as piri & tommy, "unlock it", was first released as an Apple Music exclusive on 13 September 2022 and then re-released on 11 November 2022. The song was a cover of "Unlock It", the Charli XCX, Kim Petras and Jay Park song from Charli XCX's 2017 mixtape Pop 2, and has been described as a "blend [of] bubblegum pop and drum & bass". In December 2022, the band were longlisted for the BBC's Sound of 2023, and later that month she uploaded four of her own solo compositions to SoundCloud, the songs "lonely v2", "oh baby ! v3", "supposed to v3" and "sunblock v1".

2023–present: "Feel It" and "updown"
On 12 January, McBurnie announced via TikTok that for subsequent single releases, she and Villiers would revert to being credited as separate artists, as they were with "it's a match". Their first such release, "Feel It", was released on 20 January 2023, and was credited to "MJ Cole ft. piri & Tommy Villiers"; the song  has been described as "UK garage-oriented". The song contains a guitar solo from Tommy Villiers, and was first played on Danny Howard's Radio 1's Dance Party. The original version was used in the 13 February 2023 broadcast of series 9 of Love Island.

On 17 February 2023, McBurnie released a further single, "updown", which was credited to "piri & Tommy Villiers", which became BBC Radio 1's Hottest Record for that week; she told Danny Howard's Radio 1 Dance Party that she had written it about a year earlier, and that it had a "really fast […] four-to-the-floor beat". The song was written about sex. The song features a "Crazy Frog drop" at the end; she told Capital Dance upon its release that Villiers had added it during preparation for piri & tommy live sets, as he wanted it to "pop off extra hard[, …] then we loved it so much we kept it in the full thing". A music video for the song was released on 2 March 2023.

Artistry

Voice and songwriting

Descriptions of McBurnie's voice have ranged from "dreamy" to "sugar sweet" to "whispery" to "porcelain". She has credited Tommy Villiers with helping her realise what she was capable of; she told DIY in September 2022 that she "didn’t really ever intend to be a musician. I always played guitar, but I didn’t really see any way to make actual music. It seemed like, super impossible. I would always just write songs, [but it was] very much a hobby".

McBurnie co-wrote piri & tommy's entire froge.mp3 mixtape with Villiers. Her songwriting has been described as having a "no-messing-about attitude[;] she tells it how it is, always". She told Notion Magazine in March 2022 that she usually writes about "whatever [she's] feeling at that exact time", and that "a lot of our songs kind of act like a snapshot of how life/ our relationship was at the time of the writing which is fun". The first song she and Villiers wrote together was "sunlight", the last track on froge.mp3.

Influences
She told 1883 in September 2021 that she "grew up in a house with an R&B and hip-hop mum and a rock'n'roll dad", that her favourite artist growing up was the Arctic Monkeys, and that her then-current "taste [was] much more based on good vibes and dance music, artists like Disclosure, MJ Cole and of course PinkPantheress". She is also a fan of Doja Cat and Red Velvet, and takes inspiration from Nia Archives, Charli XCX and Sophie. In an interview with Reform Radio the following month, she mentioned that she got into dance music after being introduced to it at university,  and in an interview with Reprezent Radio in March 2022, she pointed out that she was listening to "loads of tech house" while writing her dissertation.

Social media
According to The Times in November 2022, she had "over 419,000 followers" on TikTok; she told 1883 in September 2021 that she considered it "the best place as a small creator to get yourself out to people", but that she had had her account banned three times due to "the banning issue[…]; TikToks are constantly taken down despite them completely adhering to the community guidelines and users are being banned if this happens to them multiple times". She told Vice in May 2022 that "I feel like I make more TikToks than the label could ever ask for." She also maintains Twitter and Instagram accounts, the usernames for which both use the suffix .io.

McBurnie is noted for her readiness in sharing her personal life with her followers to a greater extent than other pop stars of previous generations. Her openness extends to the way she speaks to live audiences, with a September 2022 Brighton & Hove News review enjoying "the candid way [piri] spoke to the audience", and noting that when "she introduced songs she'd be upfront about what they were about, ranging from disgusting exes to finding love and comfort in a person effortlessly".

Music videos and stage

A crocheted frog hat is a staple of her signature look; she told DORK in November 2022 that when she and Villiers met, she was in a phase of drawing frogs and toads, and they started calling each other 'froge' as a nickname. Her amphibian motif extended into the band's "on & on" video, which featured her accidentally eating a psychedelic frog-filled hot dog, and in the band's "updown" video, where she turns the director into a frog. She is also noted for her pole dancing, which she started at the pole fitness society at Lancaster University whilst in her second year after attending a taster session with her housemate as a joke, and which she occasionally integrates into her performances, such as in the music videos for "soft spot" and "updown", and whilst performing on-stage. She told Reform Radio in October 2021 that she considered it "amazing for fitness" and "a great way to make friends".

piri & tommy live shows occasionally featured cover versions, such as "Move Your Body" by Marshall Jefferson, "LK (Carolina Carol Bela)" by DJ Marky and Xerxes de Oliveira featuring Stamina MC, Gypsy Woman by Crystal Waters, and "Everybody Dance" by Chic. In 2022, they performed at Glastonbury and Reading Festival.

Personal life

Relationships
McBurnie was in a relationship with Tommy Villiers, a member of Porij and See Thru Hands, after matching on Tinder and going for a date at Piccadilly Gardens in Manchester. During the third United Kingdom COVID-19 lockdown in 2020, they formed a support bubble in a student house in Manchester. In January 2023 it was reported that McBurnie and Villiers had broken up, but that "music in the bank" would still be released, and that they would continue to work together.

Activism
McBurnie has been vocal about her experiences as a woman in the music industry; she used a 8 March 2023 Hunger Magazine article to state that there was a "long way to go for equality" and that "[o]nline, I constantly see female success being attributed to their attractiveness and not their hard work and talent. […] Women have to work so much harder to prove themselves." She has also specifically criticised the misogyny she and other female creatives receive in comment sections, using a May 2022 VICE article to say that "Half the things I post, I get hate for. And I know that if a guy posted this, even if Tommy did rather than me, he would get overwhelming love. […] Girls get hate just for existing."

NME reported in December 2022 that McBurnie, Venbee, Willow Kayne, A Little Sound, Charlotte Plank and Lucy Tun were amongst "more than 50 drum 'n' bass, pop and R&B artists at all stages in their careers" to be part of Loud LDN, a collective of London-based female and non-binary creatives founded in May 2022 by coupdekat and Maisi.

Discography

Singles

As featured artist

Guest appearances

References

English drum and bass musicians
Drum and bass musicians
English dance musicians
21st-century British singers
21st-century British rappers
Singers from Manchester
Rappers from Manchester
Living people
1999 births
Polydor Records artists